The Eastern Zone was one of the three regional zones of the 1957 Davis Cup.

5 teams entered the Eastern Zone, with the winner going on to compete in the Inter-Zonal Zone against the winners of the America Zone and Europe Zone. The Philippines defeated Japan in the final and progressed to the Inter-Zonal Zone.

Draw

Quarterfinals

India vs. Malaya

Semifinals

Philippines vs. India

Japan vs. Ceylon

Final

Philippines vs. Japan

References

External links
Davis Cup official website

Davis Cup Asia/Oceania Zone
Eastern Zone
Davis Cup
Davis Cup Eastern Zone